The Pentax Optio series is a line of consumer digital cameras manufactured by Pentax Corporation.  It consists mostly of point-and-shoot cameras, and encompasses the bulk of Pentax's lower-end camera models.  These products typically range in cost from US$200-US$500, with specific "W" models targeted for underwater and outdoor use.

Models 

 
Note: current models are highlighted in blue.

Gallery

See also 

 Fujifilm FinePix T-series
 List of Pentax products
 Olympus VR-310

References

General references

External links 
 Pentax support and manuals
 Pentax manuals

Optio